Pilar, officially the Municipality of Pilar, is a municipality in the province of Abra in the Cordillera Administrative Region of the Philippines. The population was 10,146 at the 2020 census.

Geography

According to the Philippine Statistics Authority, the municipality has a land area of  constituting  of the  total area of Abra.

Barangays
Pilar is politically subdivided into 19 barangays. These barangays are headed by elected officials: Barangay Captain, Barangay Council, whose members are called Barangay Councilors. All are elected every three years.

Climate

Demographics

In the 2020 census, Pilar had a population of 10,146.

Economy

Government
Pilar, belonging to the lone congressional district of the province of Abra, is governed by a mayor designated as its local chief executive and by a municipal council as its legislative body in accordance with the Local Government Code. The mayor, vice mayor, and the councilors are elected directly by the people through an election which is being held every three years.

Elected officials

References

External links
 [ Philippine Standard Geographic Code]

Municipalities of Abra (province)